The Study on global AGEing and adult health (SAGE) is run by the World Health Organization.  An objective for SAGE is to compile comprehensive longitudinal data on the health and well-being of adult populations and the ageing process across different countries, through primary data collection, secondary data analysis and cross-study collaborations.

SAGE baseline data (Wave 0, 2002–04) was collected as part of WHO's World Health Survey (WHS).  A second round of data collection (Wave 1, 2007–10) is completed, expanding the sample sizes in each participating country (China, Ghana, India, Mexico, the Russian Federation and South Africa).  Wave 2 (2014/15) data collection was completed in 2015.  Wave 3 has been implemented in 2017/19.

SAGE Wave 0 (2002/04)
A baseline cohort for the six participating countries was created as part of the larger World Health Survey effort and contains data on the situation of 65,964 adults aged 18 years and older, including over 20,000 persons aged 50 years and older.  Samples of these respondents were followed-up as a part of SAGE Wave 1 (2007–10) data collection in four of the six SAGE countries (Ghana, India, Mexico and the Russian Federation).  Meta- and micro-data are in the public domain through WHO at http://apps.who.int/healthinfo/systems/surveydata/index.php/catalog/whs.

SAGE Wave 1 (2007/10)
Weighted data for China, Ghana, India, Mexico, Russian Federation and South Africa are in the public domain (see Study on global AGEing and Adult Health). SAGE's first full round of data collection included both follow-up and new respondents in four participating countries. The goal of the sampling design was to obtain a nationally representative cohort of persons aged 50 years and older, with a smaller cohort of persons aged 18 to 49 for comparison purposes. The target sample size was 5000 households with at least one person aged 50+ years and 1000 households with an 18- to 49-year-old respondent. In the older households, all persons aged 50+ years (for example, spouses and siblings) were invited to participate. Proxy respondents were identified for respondents who were unable to respond for themselves.  The pooled data set will include over 43,000 respondents (see table below).

Data collected, Wave 1
Standardized SAGE survey instruments were used in all countries consisting of five main parts: 1) household questionnaire; 2) individual questionnaire; 3) proxy questionnaire; 4) verbal autopsy questionnaire; and, 5) appendices including showcards. A question by question guide (Survey Manual) is available. A VAQ was completed for deaths in the household over the last 24 months. The procedures for including country-specific adaptations to the standardized questionnaire and translations into local languages from English follow those developed by and used for the World Health Survey.

Descriptive results from SAGE Wave 1 are available through a US Census Bureau/WHO report  Shades of Gray: A Cross-Country Study of Health and Well-Being of the Older Populations in SAGE Countries, 2007-2010.

Background information on SAGE is also available through:
 Kowal P, Chatterji S, Naidoo N, Biritwum R, Wu Fan, Lopez Ridaura R, Maximova T, Arokiasamy P, Phaswana-Mafuya N, Peltzer K, Williams S, Snodgrass JJ, Minicuci N, D'Este C, Boerma JT and the SAGE Collaborators. Data Resource Profile: The WHO Study on global AGEing and adult health (SAGE). Int J Epidemiol. 2012;41(6):1639-49.

SAGE Wave 2 (2014/15)
Data collection for SAGE Wave 2 was completed in 2015 in all SAGE countries, except the Russian Federation, who are planning to complete implementation in line with SAGE Wave 3 for the other participating countries.

SAGE Wave 3 (2017/19)
Data for SAGE Wave 3 in China, Ghana, India, Mexico and South Africa will be available in 2019.

Links to other studies
SAGE adapted methods and instruments used by the WHS and/or from 16 surveys on ageing (including the US Health and Retirement Survey (HRS) and the UK English Longitudinal Study of Ageing (ELSA) to collect household data on persons aged 50 years and older in over 20 countries, as well as fostering links to other data collection efforts such as the Study on Health, Ageing and Retirement in Europe (SHARE), the Chinese Health and Retirement Survey (CHARLs), the  Longitudinal Ageing Study in India (LASI).

An R21-funded effort, SAGE+ Wave 1 - which harmonized data from SAGE, HRS, ELSA and SHARE, resulted in a first publication in 2016. Minicuci N, Naidoo N, Chatterji S, Kowal P. Data Resource Profile: Cross-national and cross-study sociodemographic and health-related harmonized domains from SAGE plus ELSA, HRS and SHARE (SAGE+), Wave 1 Int J Epidemiol. 2016. (NIA grant R21AG034263)

SAGE-like surveys have been conducted as the World Health Survey Plus (WHS+) in the Gulf Cooperation Council countries, as a short version of SAGE in eight demographic surveillance fieldsites INDEPTH; as a full SAGE in three INDEPTH fieldsites; and, as COURAGE in Europe in three European countries.

SAGE Tunisia was completed in 2016.
SAGE Al-Ain (UAE) started interviews in April 2017.
SAGE Mongolia is completed in 2018.

SAGE Salt & Tobacco nested sub-study in SAGE Ghana and SAGE South Africa Waves 2 and 3 
A goal of this sub-study is to monitor change in cardiovascular outcomes associated with salt reduction, including blood pressure, and examine tobacco consumption levels and patterns. One wave of spot and 24-hr urine capture plus urinary sodium and potassium measurements was completed as part of WHO's SAGE Wave 2 (2014/15) in Ghana and South Africa. A follow-up wave of urine capture will be nested within SAGE Wave 3 (2017). Incorporation of the gold standard measure of salt intake (24h urine samples) to assess habitual salt consumption and GATS harmonized tobacco questions.  Sodium, potassium, iodine and cotinine will be assessed in the urine samples. This sub-study is supported by an agreement with the CDC Foundation with financial support provided by Bloomberg Philanthropies, a Partnerships & Research Development Fund (PRDF) grant from the Australia
Africa Universities Network, and WHO.

See, Charlton et al. BMJ Open. 2016;6(11):e013316. DOI:10.1136/bmjopen-2016-013316

SAGE-INDEPTH
Data for the summary SAGE module added to INDEPTH census rounds in 2007 and 2008 (Wave 1) is available through WHO SAGE and INDEPTH.  These data include the SAGE health state descriptions, WHO Disability Assessment Schedule version 2 (WHODAS-II) and the WHO Quality of Life (WHOQoL) 8-item version as measures of health and subjective well-being, linked to selected sociodemographic data from the demographic surveillance fieldsites in eight countries (Bangladesh, Ghana, India, Indonesia, Kenya, South Africa, Tanzania and Viet Nam).  The sample size is over 46,000 respondents.  First results are published as 'Growing Older in Africa and Asia: Multicentre study on ageing, health and well-being' in the peer-reviewed open-access journal, Global Health Action.

Wave 2 - the INDEPTH Network is responsible for implementing Wave 2.

SAGE-WOPS HIV study
Three waves of the SAGE Well-being of Older People Study (WOPS) HIV study have been conducted in two countries, South Africa and Uganda, with the goal of providing data on the effects of HIV/AIDS among older people infected or affected by HIV. The aim of this study was to describe the health status, well being and functional status among older people either infected with HIV themselves, or affected by HIV/AIDS in their families. The impacts of caregiving and ART were also examined.  Wave 1 was completed in 2010/11 and Wave 2 was completed in 2013. Wave 3 was completed in 2016/17, and Wave 4 will be implemented in 2019. Two papers from Wave 1 results are listed below.

 Scholten F, Mugisha J, Seeley J, Kinyanda E, Nakubukwa S, Kowal P, Naidoo N, Boerma T, Chatterji S, Grosskurth H. Health and functional status among older people with HIV/AIDS in Uganda. BMC Pub Health. 2011;11:886.

 Nyirenda M, Chatterji S, Falkingham J, Mutevedzi P, Hosegood V, Evandrou M, Kowal P,   Newell M-L. An investigation of factors associated with the health and wellbeing of HIV-infected and HIV-affected older people in rural South Africa. BMC Pub Health. 2012;12:259.

Direction
WHO SAGE consists of Dr Somnath Chatterji as Principal Investigator, Dr Paul Kowal as co-Principal Investigator, Ms Nirmala Naidoo as co-PI and lead statistician, with regular contributions from other members of WHO's Department of Health Statistics and Information systems (HSI). Survey teams in each participating country lead the data capture efforts, from data collection to dissemination, and contribute to analysis and manuscript preparation.  

Wave 1 country Primary Investigators: Dr Wu Fan, Shanghai CDC, China; Prof Richard Biritwum, University of Ghana, Ghana; Prof Perianayagam Arokiasamy, IIPS, India; Ms Rosalba Roja, Dr Ruy López Ridaura, Dr Mara Tellez Rojo, INSP, Mexico; Dr Tamara Maximova, RAMS, Russian Federation; and, Dr Refilwe Nancy Phaswana-Mafuya and Dr Karl Peltzer, HSRC, South Africa. 
Wave 2 country Primary Investigators: Dr Wu Fan, Shanghai CDC, China; Prof Richard Biritwum and Dr Alfred Yawson, University of Ghana, Ghana; Prof Perianayagam Arokiasamy, IIPS, India; Mr Aaron Salinas Rodriguez and Ms Betty Soledad Manrique Espinoza, INSP, Mexico; and, Dr Stephen Rule, Outsourced Insight, South Africa. 
Wave 3 country Primary Investigators: Dr Wu Fan, Shanghai CDC, China; Prof Richard Biritwum and Dr Alfred Yawson, University of Ghana, Ghana; Prof Perianayagam Arokiasamy, IIPS, India; Mr Aaron Salinas Rodriguez and Ms Betty Soledad Manrique Espinoza, INSP, Mexico; and, Dr Stephen Rule, HSRC, South Africa.

Funding
SAGE and SAGE sub-studies are supported by the World Health Organization and the Division of Behavioral and Social Research at the National Institute on Aging (NIA BSR), US National Institutes of Health, through Interagency Agreements (OGHA 04034785; YA1323-08-CN-0020; Y1-AG-1005-01) with WHO and a Research Project Grant R01 AG034479. NIA BSR has facilitated forums for in-depth discussions about study content, design and implementation. The NIA BSR has been instrumental in promoting linkages between longitudinal studies on ageing and adult health around the world.

Governments in three countries, China, Mexico and South Africa, provided financial support for SAGE Wave 1. The University of Ghana provided financial and in-kind support. USAID funding contributed to an oversample of adult women in SAGE India Wave 1.  The Shanghai municipal government provided support for SAGE Wave 2 in China, while the University of Ghana provided financial and in-kind support.

Wave 3 is supported through NIA Research Project Grant R01 AG034479 and in-kind or financial support from implementing partners in collaborating countries. Seeking co-funding from governments.

SAGE Salt & Tobacco sub-study is supported by an agreement with the CDC Foundation with financial support provided by Bloomberg Philanthropies, a Partnerships & Research Development Fund (PRDF) grant from the Australia Africa Universities Network, and WHO.

The European Commission under Seventh Framework Programme has provided financial support to implement a SAGE-like health status, quality of life and well-being study in Europe under the name "collaborative research on ageing in Europe (COURAGE in Europe)".  Finland, Poland and Spain implemented the survey in 2010.

External links
 Study on global AGEing and Adult Health (SAGE)
 African Research on Ageing Network (AFRAN)
 Australian Longitudinal Study on Women's Health (ALSWH)
 China Health and Retirement Longitudinal Study (CHARLs)
 Comparisons of Longitudinal European Studies on Ageing (CLESA)
 Costa Rican Study of Longevity and Healthy Aging (CRELES) 
 Dynamic Analyses to Optimize Ageing (DYNOPTA)
 English Longitudinal Study of Ageing (ELSA)
Global Ageing Survey (retirement and financial well-being study)
 US Health and Retirement Survey (HRS)
 INDEPTH (Health and Demographic Surveillance Systems for ageing and adult health research)
 Japanese Study of Aging and Retirement (JSTAR)
 Korean Longitudinal Study of Ageing (KLoSA)
 Longitudinal Ageing Study in India (LASI)
 Mexican Family Life Survey (MxFLS)
 Mexican Health and Aging Study (MHAS)
 New Zealand Health, Work and Retirement (NZHRS)
 Puerto Rican Elderly: Health Conditions (PREHCO)
 Study on Health, Ageing and Retirement in Europe (SHARE)
 10/66 Dementia Research Group
 The Irish Longitudinal Study on Ageing (TILDA)
 The Gateway to Global Aging Data
 Health and Aging in Africa: Longitudinal Studies of INDEPTH Communities (HAALSI)

 
World Health Organization